Alfred Rolfe may refer to:

 Alfred Rolfe (headmaster) (1870–1941), English-born Australian clergyman and teacher
 Alfred Rolfe (director) (1862–1943), Australian film director and actor